This is a list of airports in Madagascar, sorted by location.



Airports 

Airport names shown in bold have scheduled commercial airline service.

See also 
 Transport in Madagascar
 Military of Madagascar#Aircraft
 List of airports by ICAO code: F#Madagascar
 Wikipedia: WikiProject Aviation/Airline destination lists: Africa#Madagascar

References 
 
  - includes IATA codes
 Great Circle Mapper: Madagascar - reference for airport codes and coordinates

 
Madagascar
Airports
Airports
Madasgascar